The 2021–22 Magyar Kupa, known as  for sponsorship reasons, was the 64th edition of the tournament.

Telekom Veszprém won their twenty-ninth title.

Schedule
The rounds of the 2021–22 competition are scheduled as follows:

Teams

Matches
A total of 44 matches were take place, starting with Round I on 5 October 2021 and culminating with the Final on 24 April 2022.

First round
The first round ties was scheduled for 5–20 October 2021.

|-
!colspan="3" style="background:#ccccff;"| 5 October

|-
!colspan="3" style="background:#ccccff;"| 6 October

|-
!colspan="3" style="background:#ccccff;"| 7 October

|-
!colspan="3" style="background:#ccccff;"| 8 October

|-
!colspan="3" style="background:#ccccff;"| 12 October

|-
!colspan="3" style="background:#ccccff;"| 13 October

|-
!colspan="3" style="background:#ccccff;"| 19 October

|-
!colspan="3" style="background:#ccccff;"| 20 October

|}

Second round
The second round ties was scheduled for 2–10 November 2021.

|-
!colspan="3" style="background:#ccccff;"| 2 November

|-
!colspan="3" style="background:#ccccff;"| 4 November

|-
!colspan="3" style="background:#ccccff;"| 5 November

|-
!colspan="3" style="background:#ccccff;"| 10 November

|}

Third round
The third round ties was scheduled for 30 November – 15 December 2021.

|-
!colspan="3" style="background:#ccccff;"| 30 November

|-
!colspan="3" style="background:#ccccff;"| 7 December

|-
!colspan="3" style="background:#ccccff;"| 10 December

|-
!colspan="3" style="background:#ccccff;"| 14 December

|-
!colspan="3" style="background:#ccccff;"| 15 December

|}

Fourth round
The fourth round ties were scheduled for 19 January – 9 February 2022.

|-
!colspan="3" style="background:#ccccff;"| 19 January

|-
!colspan="3" style="background:#ccccff;"| 28 January

|-
!colspan="3" style="background:#ccccff;"| 31 January

|-
!colspan="3" style="background:#ccccff;"| 9 February

|}

Fifth round
The fifth round ties was scheduled for 9–23 March 2022.

|-
!colspan="3" style="background:#ccccff;"| 9 March

|-
!colspan="3" style="background:#ccccff;"| 22 March

|-
!colspan="3" style="background:#ccccff;"| 23 March

|}

Final four
The final four will be held on 23–24 April 2022 at the Audi Aréna in Győr.

Awards
Most valuable player:  
Best Goalkeeper:

Final standings

Semi-finals

Bronze medal match

Final

See also
 2021–22 Nemzeti Bajnokság I
 2021–22 Nemzeti Bajnokság I/B
 2021–22 Nemzeti Bajnokság II

References

External links
 Hungarian Handball Federaration 

Magyar Kupa Men